In the medieval history of Europe, Bulgaria's status as the Bulgarian Empire (Balgarsko tsarstvo ) occurred in two distinct periods: between the seventh and the eleventh centuries and again between the twelfth and the fourteenth centuries. The two "Bulgarian Empires" are treated not as separate entities but rather as one state that was restored after a period of Byzantine rule over its territory.

First Bulgarian Empire

Moesia was repeatedly invaded by both Slavs and Bulgars during the 5th, 6th and 7th centuries.  In 499, the Bulgars crossed Danube and reached Thrace where on the banks of the river Tzurta (considered a tributary of Maritsa) defeated 15,000 men strong Roman army led by magister militum Aristus.

In the 670s under the rule of Asparukh the Bulgars settled further south on territories of the Eastern Roman Empire in Scythia Minor near the Danube Delta in a region called Ongal and allied with the local Slavs. Their horde was a remnant of Old Great Bulgaria, an extinct tribal confederacy or rudimentary state situated north of the Black Sea in what are now parts of Ukraine and Russia. There was a major battle between Asparukh and the Byzantine Emperor in Moesia in 680.

A peace treaty with the Byzantine Empire was signed in 681, marking the foundation of the First Bulgarian Empire on the territory both north and south of the lower course of the Danube River as an alliance between the ruling Bulgars and the numerous Slavs in the area, becoming the oldest still existing Slavic state. The minority Bulgars formed a close-knit ruling caste. It is usually described as having lasted between 681 and 1018, when it was subjugated by the Byzantine Empire despite Emperor Samuel's fierce resistance. 

Tervel of Bulgaria, son of Asparukh, was the ruler at the beginning of the 8th century. In 705, Emperor Justinian II named him Caesar, the first foreigner to receive this title. Tervel played an important role in defeating the Arabs during the Siege of Constantinople in 717–718. During Krum’s reign in the early 9th century, Bulgarian territory doubled in size, spreading from the middle Danube to the Dnieper and from Odrin to the Tatra Mountains. His able and energetic rule brought law and order to Bulgaria and developed the rudiments of state organization.

Bulgaria gradually reached its cultural and territorial apogee in the 9th century and early 10th century under Prince Boris I and Emperor Simeon the Great, when its early Christianization in 864 allowed it to develop into the cultural and literary center of Slavic Europe, as well as one of the largest states in Europe, thus the period is considered the Golden Age of medieval Bulgarian culture. Major events included the development of the Cyrillic script at the Preslav Literary School, declared official in 893, and the establishment of the liturgy in Old Bulgarian, also called Old Church Slavonic.

In 971, the capital city of Preslav was occupied by the Kievan Rus' and the Eastern Roman Empire consequently. In 1018, the First Bulgarian Empire ended and Bulgaria became a province of the Byzantine Empire, the Theme of Bulgaria (1018-1185).

Second Bulgarian Empire

The medieval Bulgarian state was restored as the Second Bulgarian Empire after a successful uprising of two nobles from Tarnovo, Asen and Peter, in 1185, and existed until it was conquered during the Ottoman invasion of the Balkans in the late 14th century, with the date of its subjugation usually given as 1396, although some fringe views place it at 1422. 
Until 1256, the Second Bulgarian Empire was the dominant power in the Balkans, defeating the Byzantine Empire in several major battles.

In 1205, Emperor Kaloyan defeated the newly established Latin Empire in the Battle of Adrianople. His nephew Ivan Asen II defeated the Despotate of Epiros and made Bulgaria a regional power again. During his reign, Bulgaria spread from the Adriatic to the Black Sea and the economy flourished. Under Ivan Asen II in the first half of the 13th century the country gradually recovered much of its former power, though this did not last long due to internal problems and foreign invasions.

Bulgarian artists and architects created their own distinctive style. Until the 14th century, during the period known as the Second Golden Age of Bulgarian culture, literature, art and architecture flourished. The capital city Tarnovo, which was considered a "New Constantinople", became the country's main cultural hub and the centre of the Eastern Orthodox world.

The Empire became tributary to the Golden Horde, a successor state of the Mongol Empire in the 13th to 14th centuries. After the death of Emperor Ivan Alexander in 1371 Bulgaria was split into three countries and in the following decades fell under the domination of the Ottomans. In 1393 after siege Tarnovo was conquered by the Ottoman Empire and in 1396 Vidin (Бъдин) kingdom was defeated. After the Ottoman conquest, many Bulgarian clerics and scholars emigrated to Serbia, Wallachia, Moldavia, and Russian principalities, where they introduced Bulgarian culture, books, and hesychastic ideas.

Maps

See also

List of Bulgarian monarchs
Bulgarian dialects
Bulgarian Exarchate
Bulgarian language
Bulgarians
Byzantine–Bulgarian wars
Early Cyrillic alphabet
History of Bulgaria
History of Europe
History of Sofia
History of the Balkans
Huns
Kingdom of Bulgaria
List of empires
List of medieval great powers
List of predecessors of sovereign states in Europe
List of sovereign states by date of formation § Europe
Principality of Bulgaria
South Slavs
Timeline of Bulgarian history
Timeline of sovereign states in Europe

References

Works cited

Further reading 

 
 
 
 
 
 

 
1396 disestablishments in Europe
1st millennium in Bulgaria
2nd millennium in Bulgaria
681 establishments
Bulgarian Emp
Bulgarian Emp
Empire
Bulgarian Emp
Bulgarian Emp
2nd-millennium disestablishments in Bulgaria